Lunar Poetry is the third and final demo by Ukrainian black metal band Nokturnal Mortum. It was released on cassette tape in April 1996, through Morbid Noizz and MetalAgen Records.

The album was released on CD in 2001 by The End Records.

Track listing

References

External links 

 

1996 albums
Nokturnal Mortum albums